Roosevelt Melvin "Booba" Barnes (September 25, 1936 – April 2, 1996) was an American Delta blues guitar player and vocalist. One commentator noted that Barnes, R. L. Burnside, Big Jack Johnson, Paul "Wine" Jones and James "Super Chikan" Johnson were "present-day exponents of an edgier, electrified version of the raw, uncut Delta blues sound."

Career
Born in Longwood, Washington County, Mississippi, United States, Barnes got his start in 1960 as a member of the Swinging Gold Coasters, a local Mississippi blues outfit. He relocated to Chicago in 1964, where he played in bars and clubs, but returned to Mississippi in 1971 and continued to perform locally into the early 1980s. In 1984, Barnes  hooked up with Lil' Dave Thompson when the latter was aged 15, and the duo played on Mississippi's juke joint circuit. Barnes opened a nightclub, the Playboy Club, in 1985, and played there with a backing group called the Playboys; they became regional blues favorites, and eventually signed to Rooster Blues, who released Barnes's debut effort in 1990.

The album was hailed by Allmusic as "an instant modern classic", and  Guitar Player called Barnes "a wonderfully idiosyncratic guitar player and an extraordinary vocalist by any standard". Barnes toured the U.S. and Europe following the album's release.

Barnes's career was interrupted in the middle of the decade when he was diagnosed with lung cancer, and he died of the disease in April 1996 in Chicago, aged 59.

Discography
The Heartbroken Man (Rooster Blues, 1990)

References

1936 births
1996 deaths
American blues guitarists
American male guitarists
American blues singers
Singers from Mississippi
People from Washington County, Mississippi
Blues musicians from Mississippi
Deaths from lung cancer in Illinois
20th-century American guitarists
Guitarists from Mississippi
20th-century American male singers
20th-century American singers